1869 is a strategy and economics trading game developed and released by the Austrian company Max Design in 1992.

Music was composed by Hannes Seifert for the Adlib OPL sound card.

Gameplay
The game is played by managing a trading company during the golden age of clipper ships, purchasing goods at one port, moving them to another and selling them at a profit.
Passengers can also be transported on certain ships.

The game supports up to 4 players who take turns giving orders to their ships. If there is more than one player then the game starts with a ship auction of a number of Schooners, the starting price is lower than they can be found for in game and the number available is always one less than the number of players.

Additional bonus revenues can be earned from running naval blockades, shipping tea to England or making a priority goods delivery.

References

External links

1869 guide by Sim

1992 video games
Amiga games
Trade simulation games
DOS games
Europe-exclusive video games
Naval video games
Video games developed in Austria
Video games set in the 19th century
Historical simulation games